The 1868 United States presidential election in Kansas took place on November 3, 1868, as part of the 1868 United States presidential election. Voters chose three representatives, or electors to the Electoral College, who voted for president and vice president.

Kansas voted for the Republican nominee, Ulysses S. Grant, over the Democratic nominee, Horatio Seymour. Grant won the state by a margin of 37.65%.

With 68.82% of the popular vote, Kansas would be Grant's third strongest victory in terms of popular vote percentage after Vermont and Massachusetts.

Results

See also
 United States presidential elections in Kansas

References

Kansas
1868
1868 Kansas elections